The Digger Papers was a free collective publication of the Diggers, one of the 1960s improvisational theatre groups in San Francisco's Haight-Ashbury district. The magazine was first published in Fall 1965. Peter Berg was one of the regular contributors to the publication. 

One of the first Digger activities was the publishing of various broadsides, which were printed by sneaking into the local Students for a Democratic Society office and using their Gestetner printer. The leaflets were eventually called The Digger Papers, and soon morphed into small pamphlets with poetry, psychedelic art, and essays. They often included statements that mocked the prevailing attitude of the counterculture promoted by less radical figures like the Haight-Independent Proprietors (HIP), Timothy Leary, and Richard Alpert. The first paper mocked the acid community, saying, "Time to forget because flowers are beautiful and the sun's not yellow, it's chicken!" They rarely included authors' names, though some had pseudonyms like "George Metevsky," a reference to the "Mad Bomber" George Metesky. The Digger Papers originated such phrases as "Do your own  thing" and "Today is the first day of the rest of your life."

The last issue of The Digger Papers, published in August 1968, featured a reprint of Richard Brautigan's poem, "All Watched Over by Machines of Loving Grace."

References

External links
The Digger Papers archive

1965 establishments in California
1968 disestablishments in California
Defunct magazines published in the United States
Entertainment magazines published in the United States
Free magazines
Haight-Ashbury, San Francisco
Magazines established in 1965
Magazines disestablished in 1968
Magazines published in San Francisco
Theatre magazines
Visual arts magazines published in the United States